The Kumaradhara River is an Indian river, in the southwestern India state of Karnataka. One of the two major rivers of Sullia, it merges with the Netravati River at Uppinangadi before flowing to the Arabian Sea. The merging of the rivers is a major event for the local villagers, as they crowd the river banks to watch what they call the "Sangama", which is a Sanskrit word for confluence.

The river is a chief tributary of Netravati river.  Kumaradhara originates in Pushpagiri Wildlife Sanctuary in Kodagu district, at an elevation of 1600 metres above mean sea level. Along its course it creates the beautiful Mallalli falls. It passes through lush evergreen forest of Western Ghats, fed by numerous smaller streams.
It merges into Netravati at Uppinangadi in Dakshin Kannada at an elevation of 40 metres above mean sea level. The total length of river is about 80 kilometres.

The river passes through two major towns; Kukke Subrahmanya and Uppinangadi.

It is believed that pilgrims visiting the Kukke Subrahmanya Temple in Subrahmanya, must cross the Kumaradhara River, taking a holy bath in it before they go on to the temple to have Darśana.

A 3 mega-watt Beedalli mini Hydel project has been built in the upstream of Mallalli waterfall. This causes safety concern about the tourists visiting the waterfalls.

References

Rivers of Karnataka
Geography of Dakshina Kannada district
Rivers of India